Mark Asigba  (born 7 July 1990) is a Ghanaian professional footballer who plays as a defender for Greek Super League 2 club Kalamata.

Career
On 12 July 2017, he signed a one-year contract with Lamia. 

On 26 May 2018, Asigba extended his contract until the summer of 2020.

Career statistics

References

External links
 

1990 births
Living people
Association football defenders
Ghanaian footballers
Ghanaian expatriate footballers
Segunda División B players
Tercera División players
Super League Greece players
Football League (Greece) players
Veria F.C. players
Olympiacos F.C. players
PAS Lamia 1964 players
Panachaiki F.C. players
Expatriate footballers in Spain
Expatriate footballers in Greece